The 2011 British Columbia Scotties Tournament of Hearts, British Columbia's women's provincial curling championship, was held January 17–23 at the Cloverdale Curling Club in Surrey, British Columbia. The winning team of Kelly Scott represented team British Columbia at the 2011 Scotties Tournament of Hearts in Charlottetown, Prince Edward Island.  Scott's team finishing 7-4 in round robin play, moving into a tiebreaker where they were eliminated playing against Nova Scotia.

Teams

Standings

Results

Draw 1
January 17, 12:00 PM PT

Draw 2
January 17, 7:30 PM PT

Draw 3
January 18, 12:00 PM PT

Draw 4
January 18, 7:00 PM PT

Draw 5
January 19, 12:00 PM PT

Draw 6
January 19, 7:00 PM PT

Draw 7
January 20, 12:00 PM PT

Draw 8
January 20, 7:00 PM PT

Draw 9
January 21, 9:30 AM PT

Tie Breaker
January 21, 2:30 PM PT

Playoffs

1 vs. 2
January 21, 7:00 PM PT

3 vs. 4
January 22, 10:00 AM PT

Semifinal
January 22, 6:00 PM PT

Final
January 23, 2:00 PM PT

Qualification round 1

The first qualification round for the 2011 British Columbia Tournament of Hearts will take place December 3–5, 2010 at the Langley Curling Club in Langley, British Columbia for the coastal region, and the Summerland Curling Club in Summerland, British Columbia for the interior region. Four teams will qualify, two from each region, for the 2011 British Columbia Tournament of Hearts January 17–23.

Coastal Teams

A Event

B Event

C Event

Interior Teams

A Event

B Event

C Event

Qualification round 2

The second qualification round for the 2011 British Columbia Tournament of Hearts will take place December 17–19, 2010 at the Comox Valley Curling Club in Courtenay, British Columbia for the coastal region, and the Williams Lake Curling Club in Williams Lake, British Columbia for the interior region. Four final teams will qualify, two from each region, for the 2011 British Columbia Tournament of Hearts January 17–23.

Coastal Teams

A & B Qualifier

Interior Teams

A & B Qualifier

References

British Columbia Scotties Tournament Of Hearts, 2011
British Columbia
Sport in Surrey, British Columbia
Curling in British Columbia
Scotties Tournament of Hearts
British Columbia Scotties Tournament of Hearts